The 2015 CONCACAF Women's U-20 Championship was the 8th edition of the CONCACAF Women's U-20 Championship, the biennial international youth football championship organised by CONCACAF for the women's under-20 national teams of the North, Central American and Caribbean region. The tournament was hosted by Honduras and took place between 3–13 December 2015, as announced by CONCACAF on 7 May 2015. A total of eight teams played in the tournament.

Same as previous editions, the tournament acted as the CONCACAF qualifiers for the FIFA U-20 Women's World Cup. The top three teams qualified for the 2016 FIFA U-20 Women's World Cup in Papua New Guinea.

The United States won their fifth title overall and fourth in a row with a 1–0 final victory over Canada. Both finalists and third-placed Mexico qualified for the World Cup.

Qualification

The eight berths were allocated to the three regional zones as follows:
Three teams from the North American Zone (NAFU), i.e., Canada, Mexico and the United States, who all qualified automatically
Two teams from the Central American Zone (UNCAF), including Honduras who qualified automatically as hosts
Three teams from the Caribbean Zone (CFU)

Regional qualification tournaments were held to determine the four teams joining Canada, Mexico, the United States, and hosts Honduras at the final tournament.

Qualified teams
The following eight teams qualified for the final tournament.

Venues
The tournament was hosted in San Pedro Sula. In the original schedule, the Estadio Francisco Morazán would host the opening day matches for Group A, as well as the semifinals, third place match and the final, while the Estadio Olímpico Metropolitano would host the remaining Group A matches and all of the Group B matches. In the final schedule, eight group matches were relocated to the Escuela Internacional Sampedrana due to rain, while all matches initially scheduled for the Estadio Francisco Morazán was played at the Estadio Olímpico Metropolitano.

Draw
The draw for the tournament took place on 4 November 2015 at 10:00 CST (UTC−6) at the Hotel Real Intercontinental in San Pedro Sula.

The eight teams were drawn into two groups of four teams. Tournament host Honduras were seeded in Group A, while defending CONCACAF Women's U-20 Championship champion United States were seeded in Group B.

Squads

Players born on or after 1 January 1996 were eligible to compete in the tournament. Each team could register a maximum of 20 players (two of whom must be goalkeepers).

Group stage
The top two teams of each group advanced to the semi-finals. The teams were ranked according to points (3 points for a win, 1 point for a draw, 0 points for a loss). If tied on points, tiebreakers would be applied in the following order:
Goal difference in all group matches;
Greatest number of goals scored in all group matches;
Greatest number of points obtained in the group matches between the teams concerned;
Goal difference resulting from the group matches between the teams concerned;
Greater number of goals scored in all group matches between the teams concerned;
Drawing of lots.

All times were local, CST (UTC−6).

The two matches originally scheduled on 5 December 2015 (Jamaica vs Canada and Trinidad and Tobago vs Honduras) were postponed due to heavy rain. As a result, all subsequent group matches were delayed by a day and relocated to the Escuela Internacional Sampedrana in San Pedro Sula.

Group A

Group B

Knockout stage
In the knockout stage, extra time and penalty shoot-out would be used to decide the winner if necessary.

Bracket

Semi-finals
Winners qualified for 2016 FIFA U-20 Women's World Cup.

Third place playoff
Winner qualified for 2016 FIFA U-20 Women's World Cup.

Final

Winners

Qualified teams for FIFA U-20 Women's World Cup
The following three teams from CONCACAF qualified for the FIFA U-20 Women's World Cup.

1 Bold indicates champion for that year. Italic indicates host for that year.

Goalscorers
7 goals

 Mallory Pugh

5 goals

 Jessie Scarpa

4 goals

 Oshay Nelson-Lawes

3 goals

 Taylor Pryce
 Elexa Bahr
 Khadija Shaw
 Ashley Sanchez

2 goals

 Sarah Kinzner
 Sarah Stratigakis
 Nérilia Mondésir
 Jacqueline Crowther
 Katty Martínez
 Kiana Palacios
 Maria Sánchez
 Blanca Solis

1 goal

 Shana Flynn
 Vital Kats
 Martina Loncar
 Sura Yekka
 Batcheba Louis
 Fátima Romero
 Chanel Hudson-Marks
 Rebeca Bernal
 Yassiel Franco
 Keisilyn Gutiérrez
 Karla Riley
 Tsaianne Leander
 Marley Canales
 Tierna Davidson
 Savannah DeMelo
 Emily Fox
 Kelcie Hedge
 Ella Stevens

1 own goal

 Cherry Velásquez

Awards
The following awards were given at the conclusion of the tournament.

Best XI
Goalkeeper:  Rosemary Chandler
Right Defender:  Emily Fox
Central Defender:  Bianca St. Georges
Central Defender:  Natalie Jacobs
Left Defender:  Tierna Davidson
Right Midfielder:  Jessie Scarpa
Central Midfielder:  Kiana Palacios
Central Midfielder:  Savannah DeMelo
Central Midfielder:  Sarah Stratigakis
Left Midfielder:  Ashley Sanchez
Forward:  Mallory Pugh

References

External links
Under 20s – Women, CONCACAF.com

 
2015
Women's U-20 Championship
2015 in women's association football
2015 CONCACAF Women's U-20 Championship
2015 in youth association football